Shoshone is a 1981–1982 steel sculpture by Mark di Suvero, installed in Bunker Hill, Los Angeles, in the U.S. state of California.

References

1980s establishments in California
1980s sculptures
Bunker Hill, Los Angeles
Outdoor sculptures in Greater Los Angeles
Steel sculptures in California